Baliochila mwanihanae is a butterfly in the family Lycaenidae. It is found in Tanzania (on the slopes of Mwanihana Mountain).

References

Butterflies described in 1998
Poritiinae
Endemic fauna of Tanzania
Butterflies of Africa